Alphaflexiviridae is a family of viruses in the order Tymovirales. Plants and  fungi serve as natural hosts. There are 65 species in this family, assigned to six genera. Diseases associated with this family include: mosaic and ringspot symptoms.

Taxonomy
The following genera are recognized:
Allexivirus
Botrexvirus
Lolavirus
Platypuvirus
Potexvirus
Sclerodarnavirus

Structure
Viruses in the genus Alphaflexiviridae are non-enveloped, with flexuous and filamentous geometries. The diameter is around 12-13 nm. Genomes are linear, around 5.4-9kb in length. The genome codes for 1 to 6 proteins.

Life cycle
Viral replication is cytoplasmic, and is lysogenic. Entry into the host cell is achieved by penetration into the host cell. Replication follows the positive stranded RNA virus replication model. Positive stranded RNA virus transcription is the method of transcription. Translation takes place by leaky scanning. The virus exits the host cell by tripartite non-tubule guided viral movement. Plants and fungi serve as the natural host. The virus is transmitted via a vector (insects). Transmission routes are vector and mechanical.

References

External links
 ICTV Report: Alphaflexiviridae
 Viralzone: Alphaflexiviridae

 
Virus families